The Giimbiyu were an indigenous Australian people of the Northern Territory. Their descendants having adopted the Kunwinjku language.

Language
The Giimbiyu consisted of three distinct groups, defined by their different varieties of the Giimbiyu language, Erre, Mangerr and Urningannngg.

Ethnonym
Giimbiyu is a collective term once used by Gaagadju people referring to the three languages formerly spoken around the Alligator Rivers region. In that language it meant 'of the rock country'.

Country
The Giimbiyu's land was around the East Alligator river area, Mount Howship and Red Lily area of the Kakadu National Park west of Gunbalanya (formerly Oenpelli). In the Erre language, this site was called Uwunbarlany, an echo of which survives in the old settlers' term for the area, Oenpelli.

History
With the establishment of a cattle station in the area, the Kunwinjku moved into the area, and renamed it Gunbalanya.

Notes and references

Notes

References

Aboriginal peoples of the Northern Territory
Arnhem Land